Mondsee (Moon Lake) is a lake in the Upper Austrian part of the Salzkammergut and near the larger Attersee. Its southwestern shore marks the border between the states of Upper Austria and Salzburg and also between the Northern Limestone Alps in the south and the Sandstone zone of the northern Alps. The Drachenwand (Dragonwall) at the southern shore of the lake is an impressive sight. Mondsee is one of Austria's last privately owned lakes. In August 2008, owner Nicolette Wächter announced it was up for sale.

In 1864, remains of neolithic pile dwellings were discovered in the lake.

New species discovered in Lake Mondsee
Two bacterial strains isolated from Lake Mondsee were recognized as new species and described as Polynucleobacter cosmopolitanus and Polynucleobacter duraquae, respectively. Both species are non-pathogenic and dwell in the lake as part of its bacterioplankton.

Fish community of Lake Mondsee
Fish living in the lake:
 esox
 lake trout
 brown trout
 rainbow trout
 The lake char became locally extinct in the last quarter of the 20th century
 European eel
 carp
 burbot
 whitefish

Mondsee in fiction

Ian Fleming mentions the Mondsee in one of his James Bond novels, Thunderball. In chapter six, Blofeld reports to the members of SPECTRE that their German unit has successfully retrieved (in secret) Himmler's hoard of jewels from Lake Mondsee.

Arno Geiger's 2018 novel Beneath Drachenwand Mountain is set mainly in Mondsee.

Gallery

References

Lakes of Upper Austria